Halifax station may refer to:

Transportation:
Halifax bus station, in Halifax, West Yorkshire, England
Halifax railway station (England), in Halifax, West Yorkshire, England
Halifax North Bridge railway station, a former station in Halifax, West Yorkshire, England
Halifax St Pauls railway station, a former station in Halifax, West Yorkshire, England
Halifax station (Nova Scotia), in Halifax, Nova Scotia, Canada
Halifax station (MBTA), in Halifax, Massachusetts, United States

Other uses:
Halifax transmitting station, in Halifax, West Yorkshire, England
Halifax Station, or North America and West Indies Station, a British Royal Navy formation from 1745 to 1956

See also
Halifax (disambiguation)